The 2017–18 National Cricket League was the nineteenth edition of the National Cricket League, a first-class cricket competition that was held in Bangladesh. The tournament started on 15 September 2017, with eight teams placed into two tiers. The top team in Tier 2 were promoted to Tier 1 for the next season, with the bottom team in Tier 1 relegated to Tier 2. Khulna Division were the defending champions.

There was a two-month break in the tournament, starting in mid-October, while the Bangladesh Premier League took place. Rajshahi Division were promoted to Tier 1 before the final round of fixtures were played. Khulna Division retained their title when they beat Dhaka Division by an innings and 49 runs in their final match. Dhaka Division were also relegated to Tier 2 for the next season.

Fixtures

Tier 1
Points table

Tier 2
Points table

References

External links
 Series home at ESPN Cricinfo

2017-18
Bangladesh National Cricket League
2017 in Bangladeshi cricket
2018 in Bangladeshi cricket
Bangladeshi cricket seasons from 2000–01